The Architects' Resistance (TAR) is a group formed in 1968 by architecture students from Columbia University, the Massachusetts Institute of Technology and Yale University. The group was formed as "a communications network, a research group, and an action group . . . concerned about the social responsibility of architects and the framework within which architecture is practiced."

The group produced position papers titled: "Architecture and Racism," "Architects and the Nuclear Arms Race," and "Architecture: Whom Does It Serve?"

The "Architecture and Racism" position paper led to the picketing of Skidmore, Owings & Merrill by TAR in 1969 for its design of the Carlton Centre in Johannesburg, South Africa during apartheid.

See also
Columbia University protests of 1968

References

Columbia University
Architecture groups
Student organizations in the United States
Student protests in New York (state)